The Finn Valley Post is a local newspaper in County Donegal, Ireland, based in the town of Ballybofey. The paper was first published on 18 July 2007 by the River Media group, which produced other local titles such as the Donegal Post and Letterkenny Post. The paper covers much of east and central County Donegal, including Ballybofey, Stranorlar, Raphoe and Lifford.

In November 2018, River Media sold the title to Iconic Newspapers. 

The publication's name comes from the River Finn which flows through the area.

2007 establishments in Ireland
Ballybofey
Mass media in County Donegal
Newspapers published in the Republic of Ireland
Publications established in 2007
Weekly newspapers published in Ireland